Townsend Coleman (born May 28, 1954) is an American voice actor who has performed in many animated series and TV commercials beginning in the early 1980s. Among his most notable roles are Michaelangelo from Teenage Mutant Ninja Turtles, Wayne Gretzky on ProStars, Jason Whittaker in Adventures in Odyssey and the title characters in Where's Wally? and The Tick.

Early life
Townsend Putnam Coleman III was born in New York City, New York, but his family relocated to Denver, Colorado in 1955.

Early work
Coleman was a disc jockey for WGCL in Cleveland, Ohio in the late 1970s. This included the weekend of July 7–8, 1979, when that radio station presented his own take on American Top 40 after the station's refusal to air the "Top 40 Disco Songs" special for that weekend.

In the same period, Coleman appeared in several plays through Jerry Leonard's Heights Youth Theater ensemble. The plays were staged at Wiley Junior High School in University Heights, Ohio – just down the road from John Carroll University. Other famous performers who appeared in Leonard's plays include the actress Carol Kane.

Shortly before becoming a voice actor, he hosted a pair of dance shows for local television stations: We're Dancin' at WNEW in New York City (now WNYW) and The Dance Show at WSB-TV in Atlanta.

Voice acting
Coleman's career as a voice actor took off in the 1980s when, having recently moved to Los Angeles, he auditioned for the role of Corporal Capeman on Inspector Gadget. He also portrayed Riot on Jem, Gobo in the animated version of Jim Henson's Fraggle Rock, Scott Howard on the animated Teen Wolf and many others. In TV commercials, he was the 7-Up "Spot", Keebler Elves, and Raid Bugs. Coleman has also been the voice of NBC commercials for programs such as Must See TV and The Tonight Show since the early 1990s. Coleman has also provided the voice for Jason Whittaker on the Focus on the Family radio drama Adventures in Odyssey since 1994. He also voiced the Autobot Mini-Cassette Rewind on the Transformers cartoon series (1986) and provided the voice of Colt in Saber Rider and the Star Sheriffs.

From 1987 to 1996, Coleman voiced Michelangelo in Teenage Mutant Ninja Turtles. Coleman also provided the voice for The Tick in the 1994 cartoon series, for which he received an Annie Award nomination. Coleman performed a wide range of voices in King's Quest VI: Heir Today, Gone Tomorrow, including Vizier Abdul Alhazred, Shamir Shamazel, Lord Azure, Ferryman, Beast and the Minotaur.

Coleman returned to the Transformers franchise by voicing Sentinel Prime in the Transformers Animated series. The character was designed to look like The Tick, as confirmed by the writers of the show at Botcon 2008, Coleman also currently provided the voice of Neddy the Mallet in the Cartoon Network series, Mighty Magiswords. Neddy's mannerisms on the show are based on The Tick which led to him being acquired the role. According to the creator Kyle Carrozza, Neddy was Townsend's first original cartoon role in years.

Recently, he also returned to the Tick franchise in the 2017 series on Amazon Prime, but this time providing the voice of the ex-superhero dog Midnight.

Filmography

Film

Video games

Television

Announcer
 NBC advertising (1992–2009)

References

External links
 

1954 births
Living people
American male voice actors
American male radio actors
American male stage actors
American male video game actors
NBC network announcers
American radio DJs
People from Cleveland Heights, Ohio
Male actors from Ohio